Piz Scerscen (Romansh, formerly Monte Rosso di Scerscen), culminating  at 3,971 m above sea level, is one of the highest peaks in the Bernina Range, straddling the border between Switzerland and Italy. It is a satellite peak of Piz Bernina, joining it by its north-east ridge via a 3,882 m pass. Its name means 'the circular mountain' ('Scerscen' is pronounced cherchen).

The mountain has a prominent secondary summit called the Schneehaube (3,875 m).

The first ascent of Piz Scerscen was by Paul Güssfeldt, Hans Grass and Caspar Capat on 13 September 1877 via the north-west spur, descending the same way. This is the well-known Eisnase route, involving a 100-metre ice pitch of between 60 and 70°, although its precise length and steepness are debated. This was the route followed by Walter Risch on the first solo ascent of the mountain in 1924. The first ascent of the north-west face was by Christian Klucker and L. Norman-Neruda on 9 July 1890.

References

External links

 Piz Scerscen on SummitPost
 PiZ Scerscen on Hikr

Bernina Range
Engadin
Samedan
Mountains of Graubünden
Mountains of Italy
Mountains of the Alps
Alpine three-thousanders
Italy–Switzerland border
International mountains of Europe
Mountains of Switzerland
Three-thousanders of Switzerland